Time Machine is American Independent Hip Hop group composed of DJ Mekalek (Matthew Katz), Stoerok (Mike Puretz),  Jaysonic (Jason Shechtman) and Comel (Eric Latham). The group formed in 1999 in Washington, D.C.

History

1999 - 2000: Formation

Attending college in Washington D.C., Comel and Jaysonic met each other through mutual friends. Active prior to Time Machine, Jaysonic turned Comel on to his body of work, some of which was recorded and produced with DJ Mekalek in Providence R.I.. Standing out was song produced called Sneakers which won the Stretch and Bobbito Battle of the Demos. While sitting in on a bedroom recording session of Jaysonic's Hot Air album, Comel randomly said a verse that would later be recorded for the project. That night would be the group's first song called Block Troopin.

Showing musical promise Jaysonic decided to put off a second solo album and would focus on making songs with Comel. On a routine night of block trooping through Washington D.C. Jaysonic would present the idea a being a group to Comel and would come up with the name Time Machine. Stoerok who attended George Washington University was later introduced to Comel and would produce the group's  2nd and 3rd songs "A Million a One Things to Do" and "Reststop Sweetheart".

With Block Troopin, Reststop Sweetheart and A Million and One Things to Do the groups would release their first 12” single titled Reststop Sweetheart on Landspeed Records.

2001 - 2004: Vinyl Singles

With college behind them, Jaysonic would move back home to Providence, R.I. where DJ Mekalek also lived, while Stoerok would move back to Boston, M.A. and Comel would remain in Washington D.C.. Though not living together the group would continue to work on music with Stoerok emailing beats and Comel flying up to Providence to record in the basement studio at Jaysonic's house. After the successful reception of Time Machine first 12” Reststop Sweetheart, the group would leave Landspeed Records and create their own record label Glow-In-The-Dark Records headed by Jaysonic and DJ Mekalek. On that label the group would release their second 12” single, Personal Ads and follow that up with their 3rd 12” single Night Lights. A point of note, Night Lights is the only Time Machine song that contains production by Jaysonic.

2004 - 2005: Slow Your Roll

With the recording complete, all members would relocate and move to Los Angeles to be together for the release of their debut album Slow Your Roll. Slow Your Roll consisted of the 12” singles plus additional works from Time Machine and collaborations with notables such as Special K of the Awesome Two, Ed O.G., and Edan. Released to critical acclaim, Slow Your Roll was noted by many critics as one of the best albums of the year becoming Triple J's album of the week in Australia and receiving XXL's Chairman's Choice. While in Los Angeles the group would work with the popular Hip Hop duo People Under the Stairs collaborating on stage as their opening touring act and in the studio on the 7” record Tuxedo Rap.

2005 - 2008: Grime Machine, TM Radio, Life Is Expensive

Released during this period was the 12” single Grime Machine and the compilation album TM Radio. TM Radio was a compilation album of members of Time Machine's solo, rare and unreleased work. Tracks included music from notable Hip Hop groups such as The Procussions, Masta Ace, Ed O.G. and Rashaan Ahmad of Crown City Rockers.

Life Is Expensive is Time Machine's second studio album. While featuring jazz samples similar to Slow Your Roll, Life Is Expensive would take its own shape with more electronic based production, samples and dance music tempos. All production would come from DJ Mekalek and Stoerok. Notable MC features of Greg Nice of Nice & Smooth and Cool Calm Pete appear on the record. Well received Life Is Expensive was featured in Billboard magazine's "Your Guide to Unsigned Bands" and The Source magazine praising the album stating "By dropping sonic pretense and being sonically adventurous, Time Machine has created of one of the most distinctive rap albums of 2008."

2012 - Present: Vicious Experiments, The Test of Time

Deciding whether to work on another studio album Time Machine released the mixtape Vicious Experiments. The project featured Jaysonic and Comel over popular production while also featuring original production from DJ Mekalek and Damu The Fudgemunk.  In 2018 Time Machine announced the completion of their 3rd studio album The Test of Time with the release date of June 22.

Musical Style and Influences

A large misconception with Time Machine is that the name actually refers to taking listeners back to another era of hip hop, but this is not the case. Time Machine noted that they have a wide range of musical influences from classic rock, jazz, 1980s dance, soul and R&B they have also been heavily influenced by late 1980s to early 1990s rap an era also known as the Golden Age. The tools used in the group's production such as the ASR-10 and MPC were popular during that era which lends their sound of sample based melodies to bits of nostalgia. Time Machine lyrically always focused on songs with specific themes. It was an important focus for studio albums that every song be about something specific. The group has been compared to acts such as People Under The Stairs, Giant Panda, and Ugly Ducking.

Discography

Albums
Slow Your Roll (2004)
Life Is Expensive (2008)
The Test of Time (2018)

12" Singles
Reststop Sweetheart (2001)
Personal Ads (2002)
Night Lights (2004)
On The Moon (2005)
Grime Machine (2005)

Compilations
TM Radio (2005)

Mixtapes
Vicious Experiments (2012)

References

External links 
 Official Time Machine website.
 Time Machine on Discogs

1999 establishments in the United States
Musical groups established in 1999
American hip hop groups